Wergiton do Rosario Calmon, known as Somália (born 28 September 1988) is a Brazilian professional footballer who plays as a midfielder.

Career
Before joining Toulouse in 2015, Somália played for Hungarian club Ferencváros.

In August 2018, he joined Saudi Arabian side Al-Shabab on a two-year contract.

Ferencváros
On 16 June 2020, he became champion with Ferencváros by beating Budapest Honvéd FC at the Hidegkuti Nándor Stadion on the 30th match day of the 2019–20 Nemzeti Bajnokság I season.

On 29 September 2020, he was member of the Ferencváros team which qualified for the 2020–21 UEFA Champions League group stage after beating Molde FK on 3-3 aggregate (away goals) at the Groupama Aréna.

Club statistics

Honours
Ferencváros
Nemzeti Bajnokság I: 2015–162019–20, 2020–21
Magyar Kupa: 2014–15,
Ligakupa: 2012–13, 2014–15
Szuperkupa: 2015

References

1988 births
Living people
Footballers from Rio de Janeiro (city)
Brazilian footballers
Association football forwards
Bangu Atlético Clube players
Resende Futebol Clube players
Paraná Clube players
Ferencvárosi TC footballers
Toulouse FC players
Al-Shabab FC (Riyadh) players
Nemzeti Bajnokság I players
Ligue 1 players
Saudi Professional League players
Brazilian expatriate footballers
Expatriate footballers in Hungary
Brazilian expatriate sportspeople in Hungary
Expatriate footballers in France
Expatriate footballers in Saudi Arabia
Brazilian expatriate sportspeople in Saudi Arabia